Vladimir Leonidovich Patkin (born 8 December 1945) is a Russian former volleyball player who competed for the Soviet Union in the 1972 Summer Olympics and 1976 Summer Olympics.He was born in Bobrov, Voronezh, Russia.

Volleyball career
He won a gold medal at the 1971 European Athletics Championships.

He a member of the Soviet team which won the bronze medal in the 1972 Olympics.  He played six matches. He was also a member of the Soviet team that won the silver medal at the 1976 Olympics.

He later became the Secretary General of the Russian Volleyball Federation.

See also
List of select Jewish volleyball players

References

External links
 
 

 

1947 births
Living people
Soviet men's volleyball players
Olympic volleyball players of the Soviet Union
Volleyball players at the 1972 Summer Olympics
Olympic bronze medalists for the Soviet Union
Olympic medalists in volleyball
Russian men's volleyball players
Volleyball players at the 1976 Summer Olympics
Olympic silver medalists for the Soviet Union
Jewish volleyball players
Soviet Jews
Russian Jews
People from Bobrovsky District
Medalists at the 1976 Summer Olympics
Medalists at the 1972 Summer Olympics
Sportspeople from Voronezh Oblast